Donnell Washington (born February 6, 1981) is an American football defensive tackle who was born in Beaufort, South Carolina.

Early life and education 
Washington played college football at Clemson University but forwent his senior season to enter the NFL draft.

Career 
He was drafted by the Green Bay Packers in the 2004 NFL Draft but missed his rookie season due to a foot injury. The following season, he was inactive for 15 of 16 games. He was released by the club in June 2006 without having appeared in any regular season games. The same month, he was signed as a free agent with the Oakland Raiders. He was cut by the Raiders in September the same year.

References

External links
NFL stats

1981 births
Living people
American football defensive tackles
Clemson Tigers football players
Green Bay Packers players
Players of American football from South Carolina
Sportspeople from Beaufort, South Carolina